Riffelberg is a railway station on the Gornergrat railway, a rack railway which links the resort of Zermatt with the summit of the Gornergrat. It is the third highest station on the line and, considering only open-air railway stations, the third highest in Switzerland and Europe as well.

The Hotel Riffelberg is located at the station.

See also
 List of highest railway stations in Switzerland

References

External links

Railway stations in the canton of Valais
Gornergrat Railway stations